Danny Phantom: The Ultimate Enemy is a video game for the Game Boy Advance console. It is based on the episode "The Ultimate Enemy" from the television series Danny Phantom and is the first video game for the series. Players play the role of Danny Phantom in his adventure to save Amity Park from a grim future where he fights himself.

Story 
Ten years in the future, Dan Phantom, Danny Phantom's evil older-self, confronts an adult Valerie and tears down Amity Park's ghost shield. In the Ghost Zone, the Observers take notice of the destruction and employ Clockwork, the Master of Time, to make sure Danny never becomes evil.

In the present, Danny is under pressure with the upcoming Career Aptitude Test (C.A.T.). After returning home from school, Danny defeats Box Lunch, the daughter of the Box Ghost and the Lunch Lady, but causes the Nasty Burger restaurant to explode. Danny then finds a medallion that the Box Lunch leaves behind, and Mr. Lancer's C.A.T. answer booklet. Back in Danny's room, Tucker examines the medallion, only for a fusion of Skulker and Technus to appear from the future. After using the defeated SkulkTech's medallion, Danny, Sam, and Tucker arrive in Clockwork's lair where he reveals himself and battles Danny. The trio then conclude that Danny's turning point to becoming evil is cheating on the C.A.T., and escape to the future before Clockwork can defeat Danny.

After traveling to the future, Danny battles Valerie until Sam and Tucker stop her. Dan Phantom intervenes, and Danny urges Sam and Tucker to take off the time medallions so they can quickly return to the present. Dan fuses the time medallion inside Danny's body, trapping him in the future, and throws him into the Ghost Zone. After finding Vlad's ghost portal, Vlad explains how Dan was created from using his Ghost Gauntlets on Danny. Vlad uses the gauntlets to remove the time medallion so he can return to the present. 

Danny rushes to the Nasty Burger to learn that his turning point to becoming evil is supposed to be his family and friends dying in the explosion at the restaurant. Danny defeats Dan using his Ghostly Wail and traps him in the Fenton Thermos. Danny becomes weakened and unable to save his friends and family, but Clockwork appears and sets everything right again. At school the following day, Danny returns the test booklet to Mr. Lancer and allows him to take the make-up exam the following week, preventing the tragic future.

Reception 
Danny Phantom: The Ultimate Enemy received mixed reviews upon release.

References

2005 video games
Game Boy Advance games
Game Boy Advance-only games
THQ games
Ultimate Enemy
Side-scrolling video games
Altron games
Video games developed in Japan
Single-player video games